Jhetunebibi is a Hindu goddess and folk deity in Bengal, worshipped in conjunction with the Goddesses Oladevi (the Goddess of Cholera), Ajgaibibi, Chandbibi, Bahadabibi, Jholabibi and Asanbibi.

References

Hinduism in Bangladesh
Regional Hindu goddesses
Hindu folk deities